Elspeth Probyn (born 1958) is an Australian academic. She is currently Professor of Gender and Cultural Studies at the University of Sydney. She is a Fellow of the Australian Academy of the Humanities, and Fellow of the Academy of Social Sciences in Australia.

Early life and education 

In a 2019 Feminism & Psychology interview, Probyn spoke of growing up in an army family and moving frequently. She described her father as upper middle class and her mother as a Canadian whose own father had been "a staunch socialist". Probyn credited her father's concern that she and her sister speak in English accents appropriate to their class status with having awakened her early awareness about class differences. Probyn attended state schools.

Career
Concurrently, she holds positions as adjunct Professor of Cultural Geography at the University of Western Australia and as adjunct Research Professor at the University of South Australia. She received her Doctorate in Communications from Concordia University, 1989. She lectures and publishes in fields including cultural studies, media studies and sociology, with a particular focus on food, sexuality and the body. She has previously taught in Canada and the USA.

Main works 
Probyn's work has helped to establish several new areas of scholarship – from embodied research methods to cultural studies of food. Professor Probyn is the author of several groundbreaking monographs and over a hundred articles and chapters across the fields of gender, media, and cultural studies, philosophy, cultural geography, anthropology and critical psychology. 

In her first book, Sexing the Self, Probyn explores how "feminist reflexivity" emerges from the experience of affective dissonance produced when an individual's way of knowing (epistemology) conflicted with the way they are able to be in relation to the world (ontology). Clare Hemmings argues that Probyn's understanding of reflexivity points to alternative ways of promoting political transformation by building solidarity around feminist activity rather than through limiting motivations related to self-preservation and identity politics.

In Blush: Faces of Shame, published in 2005, Probyn investigates the productive aspects of shame and its capacity to generate new relational ethics. Explaining her conceptualization of shame as a productive affect, Probyn stated:When one feels shame it is a profound intra-subjective moment that has the capacity to undo something of the person - that provokes a deep psychic emotional disturbance, which is productive in every sense. Feeling shame produces a new sense of self even if it only momentary; it produces a profound reflection on the self.Her current research includes questions about the sustainability of food production and consumption from an ethnographic and cultural perspective. This draws from previous work on embodiment, gender, sexuality, ethics and cultural practice. Her exploration of these issues draws from contemporary debates about the more-than-human realm and the power of non-human agents and agencies.

As of 2018, her most recent book is Eating the Ocean (2016).

Publications 
 Sexing the self: gendered positions in cultural studies, 1993, 
 Sexy bodies: the strange carnalities of feminism, 1995, with E. Grosz, 
 Outside Belongings, 1996, 
 Carnal appetites; FoodSexIdentities, 2000, 
 Blush: faces of shame, 2005, 
 Eating the Ocean, 2016,  and

References

External links
 Elspeth Probyn, Faculty profile at University of Sydney
 Academia profile

Living people
1958 births
Gender studies academics
Fellows of the Australian Academy of the Humanities
Fellows of the Academy of the Social Sciences in Australia
Australian feminist writers